Palm Tran is the public transit bus system run by the Palm Beach County Government, serving Palm Beach County, Florida. Palm Tran also serves a portion of Broward County, Florida where it overlaps with Broward County Transit. Palm Tran has four main facilities (North Campus in West Palm Beach, South Campus in Delray Beach, Palm Tran Connection/Military Trail and the Belle Glade Facility) with its main headquarters in West Palm Beach on Electronics Way. The current Executive Director is Clinton B. Forbes.

History 
In 1971, Florida Transit Management, Inc. began service with 20 buses on seven routes. In 1980, this service was expanded to over 60 buses in 22 routes, then renamed CoTran, short for "County Transportation". Finally, in 1996, CoTran was completely restructured to over 150 buses in over 30 routes, then renamed Palm Tran, its fleet repainted to the present white and teal design scheme, and has been that way since. At that time the basic design of the livery of the buses was changed from white and orange to white and teal, some of which are screen-wrapped to the logos and design of the company that sponsors those particular buses, but preserve their Palm Tran logos and bus numbers, the latter of which are assigned a four-digit number according to the year and order in which they were acquired. Also at that time, Florida Transit Management was replaced with Palm Tran Inc., a nonprofit. Palm Tran will introduce USB charging stations on its newest fleet in early 2017.

On September 30, 2018, Palm Tran implemented the first overhaul to the entire network since 1996. In addition, free Wi-Fi was added on all busses.

Future 
On April 23, 2019, The Palm Tran broke ground on an expansion project on its South County Facility in Delray Beach, Florida. The current 3,800 Square foot space will be converted into a three-story 34,000 square foot facility. The project is set to cost 25 million, 90 percent of which is federally funded. The facility will feature charging stations for their fleet of fully electric buses; along with service stations for 20 additional buses. The building will feature art by Palm Beach County's Art in Public Places Program.

Rates 
Plexiglass shields on the driver's side are in place, to reduce interaction.

The standard adult one-way fare is $2. People eligible for the reduced fare, such as students, disabled, and senior citizens, pay $1. $5 buys an unlimited 24-hour pass ($3.50 for reduced fare). Daily and 31-day unlimited ride passes are also available for purchase at Palm Tran Connection. There are 31-day unlimited passes that are available reduced or regular costing $55 and $70 respectively. Kids below 9 ride free with fare-paying rider, limit is 3.

Bus technology 
All Palm Tran buses have bicycle racks on the front, capable of holding two bikes. They are also equipped GPS and video surveillance cameras which record activity on the bus and the outer side facing the bus stops. Recently Palm Tran has equipped all fixed-route buses with Automatic Vehicle Location technology that enables passengers to track buses and bus arrivals in real time. Palm Tran also offers real-time bus arrival information on its website or through its MyStop Mobile app, as well as on-demand through SMS. In October 2018, all 159 fixed route buses started to offer free Wi-Fi to its riders.

The Palm Tran announced plans to incorporate new payment methods in addition to cash. The new upgrades will allow the service to accept credit cards and smartphone payments. The upgrade is set to cost between 5 million and 6 million dollars.

Palm Tran Connection 
Palm Tran Connection is a shared ride, door to door, paratransit service that provides transportation for residents and visitors in Palm Beach County under six programs:
 Americans with Disabilities Act (ADA) Program
 Transportation Disadvantaged (TD) Program
 Division of Senior Services (DOSS) Program
 Board of County Commissioner (BCC) Program
 County Senior Transportation (CSTS) Program
 Medicaid
Palm Tran Connection is operated by private transport companies and oversight is provided through Palm Tran. They travel to every destination in Palm Beach County – from Jupiter to Boca Raton and from Palm Beach to South Bay. Palm Tran Connection schedules all trips, prepares vehicle manifests, handles customer concerns & commendations, determines eligibility, and monitors the performance of the Transportation Providers.

Route list 

Routes are divided into four regions within the county.

Main Corridor 
Main Corridor routes traverse the primary north–south surface roads of the county from Boca Raton in the south to Riviera Beach in the north.

North County 
North County routes mainly serve Palm Beach Gardens, Riviera Beach, and Jupiter.

Central County 
Central County routes serve West Palm Beach, Wellington, Lake Worth, and Belle Glade.

South County 
South County routes mainly serve the cities of Boynton Beach, Delray Beach, and Boca Raton.

See also 
 Transportation in South Florida

References

External links 
The official Palm Tran site

Bus transportation in Florida
Transportation in Palm Beach County, Florida
West Palm Beach, Florida